Fanni Gyurinovics (born 24 October 2001) is a Hungarian swimmer. She competed in the women's 100 metre freestyle event at the 2017 World Aquatics Championships.

References

External links
 

2001 births
Living people
People from Baja, Hungary
Hungarian female freestyle swimmers
Swimmers at the 2020 Summer Olympics
Olympic swimmers of Hungary
Sportspeople from Bács-Kiskun County
Competitors at the 2022 World Games
World Games gold medalists
World Games silver medalists
21st-century Hungarian women